George Brown Martin (August 18, 1876November 12, 1945), a Democrat, served as a member of the United States Senate from Kentucky.

Born in Prestonsburg, Kentucky, Martin moved with his parents to Catlettsburg, Kentucky, in 1877. He attended the public schools and graduated from Centre University in 1895. He studied law and was admitted to the bar in 1900, commencing practice in Catlettsburg. Before entering politics, Martin was general counsel and director of the Big Sandy & Kentucky River Railway Company and vice president of the Ohio Valley Electric Railway Company. He was also director of the Kentucky-Farmers Bank of Catlettsburg.

Martin became county judge of Boyd County, Kentucky, in 1904 and was a member of the Council of National Defense for Kentucky in 1917. He was appointed major in the Judge Advocate General's Department of the United States Army but did not serve, having been appointed as a U.S. Senator on September 7, 1918. He had been appointed as a Democrat to fill the vacancy caused by the death of Ollie M. James and served until March 3, 1919. He was not a candidate for election to the full term. While in Congress, Martin served as chairman of the U.S. Senate Committee on Expenditures in the Department of Agriculture.

After his career in politics, Martin resumed the practice of law in Catlettsburg, where he died in 1945 and was interred in Catlettsburg Cemetery.

References

Kentucky state court judges
Kentucky lawyers
Centre College alumni
1876 births
1945 deaths
Democratic Party United States senators from Kentucky
Kentucky Democrats
People from Prestonburg, Kentucky
People from Catlettsburg, Kentucky